Delhi Pharmaceutical Sciences and Research University (DPSRU) is a state university located at New Delhi, India.

History
The Delhi Pharmaceutical Science and Research University has its root in the Delhi Institute of Pharmaceutical Sciences & Research (DIPSAR). DIPSAR was founded in 1964 as Department of Pharmacy  and was located in Kashmiri gate, Delhi. In 1972, it was converted into the College of Pharmacy and moved to the campus of the Pusa Institute. Finally, in 1979 it moved to its present campus in Pushp Vihar. In 2004 it was named as Delhi Institute of Pharmaceutical Sciences & Research and affiliated to University of Delhi.

In 2008, the Government of Delhi passed the Delhi Pharmaceutical Science and Research University, 2008, The institute finally opened its gates in 2015, with DIPSAR as its constituent college, both operating from the same premises.

University has currently following units:

 Delhi Institute of Pharmaceutical Sciences (DIPSAR)
 School of Pharmaceutical Sciences
 School of Allied Health sciences with centre of Physiotherapy
 Academy of Sports Sciences Research and Management
 DPSRU Innovation & Incubation Foundation (DIIF)

See also
Jamia Hamdard
Birla Institute of Technology, Mesra
Uttar Pradesh University of Medical Sciences
Panjab University

References

External links

Universities in Delhi
Educational institutions established in 2015
2015 establishments in Delhi
Pharmacy education in India